UFC 76: Knockout was a mixed martial arts (MMA) pay-per-view event held by the Ultimate Fighting Championship. The event took place on September 22, 2007, at the Honda Center in Anaheim, California. Although the event was advertised with the subtitle Knockout, the entire card produced no knockouts whatsoever.

Background
The main event was anticipated to be Chuck Liddell versus Wanderlei Silva, a long-awaited match between the two popular former champions of the UFC and PRIDE, respectively; however, the main event featured a fight between former Light Heavyweight Champion Chuck Liddell and The Ultimate Fighter 2 alum Keith Jardine, with both fighters returning from knockout losses at UFC 71.

Also appearing on the card was 2005 Pride Middleweight Grand Prix Champion and future UFC Light Heavyweight Champion Maurício Rua, who made his Octagon debut against TUF 1 winner Forrest Griffin.

Welterweight Diego Sanchez returned after his decision loss at UFC 69 to Josh Koscheck when he faced Jon Fitch, a training partner of Koscheck and a former Purdue University wrestler who was in the midst of a thirteen-fight win streak.

A scheduled bout between the light heavyweights Jason Lambert and Wilson Gouveia was removed from the card after Gouveia suffered a severely broken nose during training. A replacement for Gouveia was not found.

With the card left with only eight bouts instead of nine, the UFC scheduled a fight between Rich Clementi and Anthony Johnson to fill out the remainder of the card.

None of the preliminary bouts made it to the PPV due to the length of all the main card bouts.

Results

Bonus awards
$40,000 was awarded to each of the fighters who received one of these three awards:

Fight of the Night: Tyson Griffin vs. Thiago Tavares
Knockout of the Night: None
Submission of the Night: Forrest Griffin

See also
 Ultimate Fighting Championship
 List of UFC champions
 List of UFC events
 2007 in UFC

References

External links
 UFC 76 Event site
 UFC 76 card

Ultimate Fighting Championship events
Events in Anaheim, California
2007 in mixed martial arts
Mixed martial arts in Anaheim, California
Sports competitions in Anaheim, California
2007 in sports in California